The RML 12.5-inch guns were large rifled muzzle-loading guns designed for British battleships and were also employed for coast defence.

Design 

The gun originated from a desire for a longer 12-inch gun than the existing RML 12-inch 35-ton gun. Experiments in 1874 with both 12-inch and 12.5-inch versions 3 feet longer than the existing 12-inch gun showed the 12.5-inch calibre was more suitable, and further experiments showed a projectile of 800 pounds could be fired with a charge of 130 pounds of P2 gunpowder without undue strain. The same construction as in the existing 12-inch 35-ton gun was used : a mild steel "A" tube toughened in oil, surrounded by wrought iron "B" tube, triple coil in front of the trunnion, coiled breech-piece and breech coil. This was approved in January 1875.

The gun was rifled on the "Woolwich" pattern of a small number of broad shallow rounded grooves, with 9 grooves increasing from 0 to 1 turn in 35 calibres ( i.e. 1 turn in 437.5 inches).

Mark II had an enlarged powder chamber and attained higher muzzle velocity and slightly longer range.

This gun was the final development of large British rifled muzzle-loading guns before it switched to breechloaders beginning in 1880. It was succeeded in its class on new battleships by the BL 12-inch Mk II gun.

Naval service 
Guns were mounted on HMS Dreadnought commissioned in 1879, HMS Agamemnon commissioned in 1883, and HMS Ajax commissioned in 1885, the last British warships completed with muzzle-loading guns.

Ammunition 
When the gun was first introduced projectiles had several rows of "studs" which engaged with the gun's rifling to impart spin. Sometime after 1878, "attached gas-checks" were fitted to the bases of the studded shells, reducing wear on the guns and improving their range and accuracy. Subsequently, "automatic gas-checks" were developed which could rotate shells, allowing the deployment of a new range of studless ammunition.

 RML 12.5in Studded Shell, located at Hurst Castle, UK
 RML 12.5in Studded Shrapnel Shell Mk I with Attached Gas-Check Mk I
 RML 12.5in Studded Palliser Shell Mk III with Attached Gas-Check Mk II
 RML 12.5in Studded Common Shell Mk I with Attached Gas-Check Mk II
 RML 12.5in Studded Shrapnel Shell Mk I with Attached Gas-check Mk II
 RML 12.5in Case Shot Mk III
 RML 12.5in Studless Palliser Shell Mk I with Automatic Gas-Check
 RML 12.5in Studless Common Shell Mk I with Automatic Gas-Check
 RML 12.5in Studless Shrapnel Shell Mk I with Automatic Gas-check

Images 3–9 show the range of ammunition for the RML 12.5-inch gun in 1885. By this time the gun no longer fired studded ammunition without gas-checks. Instead there were two sets of ammunition available, namely: older studded ammunition with attached gas-checks Mk II, and newer studless ammunition with automatic gas-checks. Case ammunition neither was studded nor required gas-checks. Also by this time, attached gas-checks Mk I as shown in image 2 had been superseded by attached gas-checks Mk II.

See also 
 List of naval guns

Surviving examples 
 Two at Hurst Castle, UK, originally at Cliff End Battery
 At Fort Nelson, Portsmouth, UK, originally at Cliff End Battery
 Outside Fort Albert, Isle of Wight
 No 22 of 1876 outside Calbourne Mill, Isle of Wight, originally at Cliff End Battery
 An unpreserved gun at Fort Delimara, Malta
 Gun on replica carriage at Harding's Battery, Gibraltar
 Gun number 87 and 95, dated 1878. Now in the ditch at Fort Cunningham, Bermuda

Notes and references

Bibliography 
 Treatise on the construction and manufacture of ordnance in the British service. War Office, UK, 1877
 Text Book of Gunnery, 1887. LONDON : PRINTED FOR HIS MAJESTY'S STATIONERY OFFICE, BY HARRISON AND SONS, ST. MARTIN'S LANE

External links 

 Handbook for the R.M.L. 12.5-inch 38-ton gun, marks I and II : casemate, dwarf, and small port mountings (land service). Great Britain. War Office. London : H.M.S.O. 1885 at State Library of Victoria
 Handbook for the 12.5-inch 38-ton R.M.L. gun, marks I and II, casemate, dwarf, and small part mountings land service 1888, 1893, 1899, 1904 at State Library of Victoria
 Diagram of gun on small port 6-foot recoil carriage at Victorian Forts and Artillery website
 Diagram of gun on Casemate Platform, 6 feet recoil Mark III at Victorian Forts and Artillery website
 Diagram of gun on Dwarf 'C' Pivot Mark III at Victorian Forts and Artillery website

Naval guns of the United Kingdom
320 mm artillery
Victorian-era weapons of the United Kingdom
Coastal artillery